Hurricane: Category 5  was a Custom Coasters International wooden roller coaster located at the Myrtle Beach Pavilion. It replaced the Corkscrew roller coaster which existed since the late 1970s. The Pavilion unveiled their multimillion-dollar coaster 6 May 2000. During operation, Hurricane held the record for being the tallest, fastest, and longest wooden roller coaster in South Carolina.  The ride closed with the Pavilion on 30 September 2006. Although Burroughs & Chapin attempted to sell the ride along with the Haunted Hotel, Log Flume, Treasure Hunt, and a few other rides, the ride was deemed too expensive a task to dismantle and relocate, and was ultimately demolished in March 2007. The only part of the ride not demolished were the two Gerstlauer trains used on the ride. These trains were shipped to Kings Island, an amusement park in Mason, Ohio. They were then repainted and installed on Son of Beast, which was at the time the world's tallest and fastest wooden roller coaster. Son of Beast was later demolished on 20 November 2012, following an incident that occurred in 2009.

References

Former roller coasters in South Carolina